Jorge Island is an ice-free island in the Aitcho group on the west side of English Strait in the South Shetland Islands, Antarctica.  Extending , surface area .  The area was visited by early 19th century sealers.

The feature was named by the Chilean Antarctic Expedition in 1949 after the son of Captain José Duarte, commanding the patrol ship Lautaro.

Location

See also
 Aitcho Islands
 Composite Antarctic Gazetteer
 List of Antarctic islands south of 60° S
 SCAR
 South Shetland Islands
 Territorial claims in Antarctica

Map
 L.L. Ivanov et al. Antarctica: Livingston Island and Greenwich Island, South Shetland Islands. Scale 1:100000 topographic map. Sofia: Antarctic Place-names Commission of Bulgaria, 2005.

References

External links
 SCAR Composite Antarctic Gazetteer.

Islands of the South Shetland Islands